Robert Vickers (born 25 November 1958, Brisbane, Australia) is an Australian bass guitarist, who is best known as a member of the Australian musical group The Go-Betweens.

Vickers visited London, England in 1977, and returned to Brisbane to join his first band, Neon Steel.  The group quickly changed their name to The Numbers and ultimately became best known as The Riptides. In 1979, he left Brisbane to live in New York City where he joined The Colors.  The Colors were managed by Hilly Kristal, owner of rock club CBGB, and produced by Blondie drummer Clem Burke. During this time he briefly returned to Brisbane to act in a film titled Heather’s Gloves, directed by Robin Gold and written by Grant McLennan of The Go-Betweens.

In January 1983, Vickers left New York and The Colors to join The Go-Betweens in London where they were signed to Rough Trade Records. He recorded three albums with the band on Sire Records and Beggars Banquet Records before returning to New York in 1988. In the 1990s he toured Japan with Yo La Tengo, and the US and Europe with Lloyd Cole. He performed with Amy Rigby and toured and recorded with The Mad Scene, which included drummer Hamish Kilgour from The Clean.  He also recorded with Malcolm Ross and Alice Texas. During a Go-Betweens US tour in 1999 he joined Robert Forster and Grant McLennan on stage at Fez in New York City, to play some of the songs they had recorded together in that band.

In 1998, Vickers became the publicist for New York indie label Jetset Records.  He left to start his own PR company, Proxy Media, in 2005.

On 4 July 2010, Vickers joined the other surviving members of The Go-Betweens at the official opening of the Go Between Bridge in Brisbane.

In October 2019 his hometown of Oxley, a suburb of Brisbane, opened Robert Vickers Place Playground in his honour.

Selected discography
 The Numbers – Sunset Strip Able Label (1978)
 The Colors – Rave It Up EP Infinite Records (1980)
 The Colors – The Colors  Dirt Records (1982)
 The Go-Betweens – Spring Hill Fair Sire Records (1984)
 The Go-Betweens – Liberty Belle And The Black Diamond Express Beggars Banquet (1986)
 The Go-Betweens – Tallulah Beggars Banquet (1987)
 Malcolm Ross – Malcolm Ross Bus Stop (1995)
 The Mad Scene – Sealight Merge Records (1995)
 The Mad Scene – Chinese Honey Merge Records (1997)
 Alice Texas – Gold Cockaigne (2000)

Further reading
David Nichols – The Go-Betweens Puncture Publications (2003)
Clinton Walker – Inner City Sound (1981)

References

External links
 go-betweens
 myspace proxymediapr
 yo la tengo

Australian rock bass guitarists
Male bass guitarists
Australian bass guitarists
1958 births
Living people
Australian expatriates in the United States
Australian expatriates in the United Kingdom
The Go-Betweens members
Australian male guitarists